Boró is a corregimiento in La Mesa District, Veraguas Province, Panama with a population of 1,757 as of 2010. Its population as of 1990 was 2,158; its population as of 2000 was 1,959.

References

Corregimientos of Veraguas Province